Eden White (born 1970) is a New York City singer-songwriter. She is the daughter of Janice White and Dr. Allen White, both from Massachusetts. After graduating from Barnstable High School, she attended Tufts University near her home in Boston, Mass. In 1993, she started touring clubs in New York city and was rewarded for her talents. In 1996, Eden served as the musical director of School House Rock, Live! off Broadway at the Atlantic Theatre in NYC, which then had an additional run at the Lamb's Theatre in Times Square.  In 1998, she released her first record, This is the Way, under the label Zero Hour. She also released the song This is the Way as a single under the duel label of Delirium Records and Touchwood (record label). By 2000, she had signed on with Delirium Records to release her second CD, What Really Matters.

She is married to Jed Morey, president of the Morey Organization. In 2000, she won Light on the Hill Award with Hank Azaria.

Discography
This Is the Way, (October 6, 1998)
Song Unsung
This Is the Way – Also released as a single
Twisted
Gold
Let Me In
Hungry
Nice
Deep Inside
Make a Difference
Try to Change You
Through the Glass
What Really Matters, (November 15, 2000)
Hey, Hey Father
Jessica
Better This Time
Everything I Feel
Twirling
Just Nobody Good Enough
Hypocrite
Tired
Since You Walked Away
March On
Letter by Letter (Song for Anne)
Prelude to Goodbye
Goodbye

References

1970 births
American women singer-songwriters
American folk singers
Living people
People from Barnstable, Massachusetts
Singer-songwriters from Massachusetts
21st-century American singers
21st-century American women singers